Castelrosso, also called Toma Brusca, is a pasteurized whole cow's milk cheese. A rare, semi-hard, ancient cheese, it comes from the Piedmont region in northwestern Italy. 

It is similar in appearance to Castelmagno.  It has a natural thick, gray rind smattered with yellow mold, and a dry, crumbly, snowy white paste. The flavor is mild: lactic, buttery, and clean with a gentle, residual tang similar to Lancashire and other English cheddar-styles. It complements Italian condiments such as grape mostarda and chestnut honeys.  As it ages it becomes harder and drier, but retains its crumbly characteristic.  It is made from whole cow's milk, rennet, salt and milk enzymes and matured in underground cellars on silver fir shelves for about 60 days.

See also
 List of cheeses

References

External links
Toma Brusca
Castelrosso

Piedmontese cheeses
Italian cheeses
Cow's-milk cheeses